Max Müller (6 September 1906 – 18 October 1994) was a German philosopher and influential post–World War II Catholic intellectual. Müller was Professor at the University of Freiburg and the Ludwig Maximilian University of Munich.

Life
Max Müller was born as the son of a jurist and completed his Gymnasium-Abitur in Freiburg at the Friedrich-Gymnasium Freiburg.  Müller graduated in 1930 along with the philosopher Martin Honecker. He established his academic reputation in 1937 with a work on Tomas Aquinas ("Reality and Rationality"'). At this time he was active in the Catholic Youth Movement who were influenced by their study with Martin Heidegger, generating their own thinking in engagement with his philosophy. During the Third Reich they were opponents of Nazism. Falling foul of Nazi educational policies, Müller was dismissed by Heidegger from research positions.

He became a member of Sturmabteilung i 1934 and applied for membership in NSDAP in 1937, but he was not accepted a member until 1940.

He became active as a lecturer at the Catholic . After the war he succeeded the late Martin Honecker in his academic positions at the University of Freiburg.

In addition to his activity at the university Müller was active in addressing social problems in Freiburg. In 1960 he moved to Ludwig Maximilians university in Munich. After his retirement he returned to Freiburg for research activity in philosophy and theology.

Müller's main influences were Honecker, Edmund Husserl and Heidegger. He was also influenced by the historian Friedrich Meinecke and the theologian Romano Guardini.

Müller's philosophy 
Müller linked classical metaphysics with phenomenology of Husserl and the existentialism of Heidegger. He developed from it a theory of “metahistory” as a philosophy of historical liberty. For Müller, the sense of history is distinctive in each epoch. The "transcendental experience" of humans is created in personal engagement through communal achievement in the world as work. Politics, religion, art and science, along with the personal relationships between people, carry material and symbolic means to attempt answers and achieve effective representations.

See also
Heidegger and Nazism

References
 Ramón Eduardo Ruiz-Pesce: Metaphysik als Metahistorik oder Hermeneutik des unreinen Denkens: die Philosophie Max Müllers. Freiburg: Alber, 1987. (Symposion; 79)  
 Wilhelm Vossenkuhl: Max Müller. In: Christliche Philosophie im katholischen Denken des 19. und 20. Jahrhunderts. Vol. 3. Ed. by. E. Coreth, W. Neidl, G. Pfligersdorffer, Graz/Wien/Köln 1990, 318–327.
 Albert Raffelt: Müller, Max. In: Lexikon für Theologie und Kirche. 3. Aufl. Bd. 7 [Maximilian bis Pazzi]. Freiburg: Herder 1998, Sp. 518–519.
 Kai-Uwe Socha: Person-sein: Freiheit und Geschichtlichkeit als Grundkonstanten des Menschen im Denken von Max Müller (1906 - 1994). Frankfurt am Main; Berlin: Lang 1999. (Europäische Hochschulschriften. Reihe 20; Band 593) 
 Veronica Fabricius: Von der Metaphysik zur Metahistorik. Freiheit als Geschichte nach Max Müller. Freiburg: Alber 2004. (Alber Thesen, Philosophie; Bd. 23) 

20th-century German philosophers
Christian continental philosophers and theologians
Phenomenologists
German Roman Catholics
Catholic philosophers
1906 births
1994 deaths
Grand Crosses with Star and Sash of the Order of Merit of the Federal Republic of Germany
German male writers
Nazi Party members
Sturmabteilung personnel